The 2007 Fordham Rams football team was an American football team that represented Fordham University during the 2007 NCAA Division I FCS football season. Fordham won the Patriot League championship, but lost in the first round of the national FCS playoffs. 

In their second year under head coach Tom Masella, the Rams compiled an 8–4 record (8–3 in the regular season). Mike Breznicky, Earl Hudnell, Mike Nardone, Sam Orah and Dominique Owens were the team captains. 

The Rams outscored opponents 348 to 298. Their 5–1 conference record was the best in the Patriot League standings. 

Fordham was unranked through most of the year, only entering the national top 25 in early November, at No. 22. The Rams were ranked No. 18 for their season-ending matchup with Bucknell, then No. 25 for the playoffs. Their final ranking was No. 20.

Fordham played its home games at Jack Coffey Field on the university's Rose Hill campus in The Bronx, in New York City.

Schedule

References

Fordham
Fordham Rams football seasons
Patriot League football champion seasons
Fordham Rams football